Places named after the Cheyenne are:

Places

Colorado

Boulder County
 Cheyenne Arapaho Hall, a building at the University of Colorado in Boulder

El Paso County
 Cheyenne Creek, Colorado
 Cheyenne Mountain, a Colorado mountain and military complex
 Cheyenne Lodge, alternate name for the Cheyenne Mountain Lodge on Cheyenne Mountain
 Cheyenne Spring House, an 1890s building enclosing one of the Manitou Mineral Springs
 North Cheyenne Cañon Park, a city-owned park including area outside both the North and South canons (Cheyenne Park and Stratton Park in 1900)
 South Cheyenne Cañon, a landform near Colorado Springs with private toll road from the Pillars of Hercules to Seven Falls

Cheyenne County
 Cheyenne County, Colorado, the 1889 area created from portions of Elbert and Bent counties
 Cheyenne County Courthouse (Colorado), a 1908 building in Cheyenne Wells
 Cheyenne County Jail, an 1894 building in Cheyenne Wells
 Cheyenne Wells, Colorado, the Cheyenne County seat

Kansas
 Cheyenne County, Kansas

Montana
 Northern Cheyenne Indian Reservation in Montana

Nebraska
 Cheyenne County, Nebraska

Oklahoma
 Cheyenne, Oklahoma, a town in Roger Mills County, Oklahoma

South Dakota
 Cheyenne Creek (South Dakota)
 Cheyenne River, in Wyoming and South Dakota
 Cheyenne River Indian Reservation in South Dakota

Wyoming
 Cheyenne, Wyoming, the capital of Wyoming
 Cheyenne belt, a tectonic suture zone
 Cheyenne River, in Wyoming and South Dakota

See also
 Cheyenne (disambiguation)
 Cheyenne County (disambiguation)
 Cheyenne Township (disambiguation)
 

Cheyenne